Eduard Le Roux Zandberg (born ) is a South African rugby union player who last played for  in the Currie Cup. His regular position is lock.

References

South African rugby union players
Living people
1996 births
People from George, South Africa
Rugby union locks
Western Province (rugby union) players
South Africa Under-20 international rugby union players
Rugby union players from the Western Cape